The sum of the reciprocals of all prime numbers diverges; that is:

This was proved by Leonhard Euler in 1737, and strengthens Euclid's 3rd-century-BC result that there are infinitely many prime numbers and Nicole Oresme's 14th-century proof of the divergence of the sum of the reciprocals of the integers (harmonic series).

There are a variety of proofs of Euler's result, including a lower bound for the partial sums stating that

for all natural numbers . The double natural logarithm indicates that the divergence might be very slow, which is indeed the case. See Meissel–Mertens constant.

The harmonic series
First, we describe how Euler originally discovered the result. He was considering the harmonic series

He had already used the following "product formula" to show the existence of infinitely many primes.

Here the product is taken over the set of all primes.

Such infinite products are today called Euler products. The product above is a reflection of the fundamental theorem of arithmetic. Euler noted that if there were only a finite number of primes, then the product on the right would clearly converge, contradicting the divergence of the harmonic series.

Proofs

Euler's proof

Euler considered the above product formula and proceeded to make a sequence of audacious leaps of logic.

for a fixed constant . Then he invoked the relation

which he explained, for instance in a later 1748 work, by setting  in the Taylor series expansion

This allowed him to conclude that

It turns out this is indeed the case, and a more precise version of this fact was rigorously proved by Franz Mertens in 1874. Thus Euler obtained a correct result by questionable means.

Erdős's proof by upper and lower estimates

The following proof by contradiction comes from Paul Erdős.

Let  denote the th prime number.  Assume that the sum of the reciprocals of the primes converges.

Then there exists a smallest positive integer  such that

For large , these bounds will turn out to be contradictory.

Upper estimate
Since only the  primes  can show up (with exponent 1) in the prime factorization of , there are at most  different possibilities for . Furthermore, there are at most  possible values for . This gives us the upper estimate 
Lower estimate
Then 
Using (1), this implies 

This produces a contradiction: when , the estimates (2) and (3) cannot both hold, because .

Proof that the series exhibits log-log growth

The proof is due to Ivan Niven, adapted from the product expansion idea of Euler. In the following, a sum or product taken over  always represents a sum or product taken over a specified set of primes.

The proof rests upon the following four inequalities:

 Every positive integer  can be uniquely expressed as the product of a square-free integer and a square as a consequence of the fundamental theorem of arithmetic. Start with  where the βs are 0 (the corresponding power of prime  is even) or 1 (the corresponding power of prime  is odd). Factor out one copy of all the primes whose β is 1, leaving a product of primes to even powers, itself a square. Relabeling:  where the first factor, a product of primes to the first power, is square free. Inverting all the s gives the inequality 
To see this, note that  and  That is,  is one of the summands in the expanded product . The inequality follows.
 The upper estimate for the natural logarithm 
 The lower estimate  for the exponential function, which holds for all .
 Let  .  The upper bound (using a telescoping sum) for the partial sums (convergence is all we really need) 

Combining all these inequalities, we see that

as desired. Q.E.D.

Using

where  is the Meissel–Mertens constant (somewhat analogous to the much more famous Euler–Mascheroni constant).

Proof from Dusart's inequality

From Dusart's inequality, we get

Then

by the integral test for convergence. This shows that the series on the left diverges.

Geometric and harmonic-series proof
Suppose for contradiction the sum converged. Then, there exists  such that . Call this sum .

Now consider the convergent geometric series .

This geometric series contains the sum of reciprocals of all numbers whose prime factorization contain only primes in the set .

Consider the subseries . This is a subseries because  is not divisible by any .

However, by the Limit comparison test, this subseries diverges by comparing it to the harmonic series. Indeed, .

Thus, we have found a divergent subseries of the original convergent series, and since all terms are positive, this gives the contradiction. We may conclude  diverges. Q.E.D.

Partial sums

While the partial sums of the reciprocals of the primes eventually exceed any integer value, they never equal an integer.

If the th partial sum (for ) has the form , then the st sum is

as the st prime  is odd; since this sum also has an  form, this partial sum cannot be an integer (because 2 divides the denominator but not the numerator), and the induction continues.

Another proof rewrites the expression for the sum of the first  reciprocals of primes (or indeed the sum of the reciprocals of any set of primes) in terms of the least common denominator, which is the product of all these primes. Then each of these primes divides all but one of the numerator terms and hence does not divide the numerator itself; but each prime does divide the denominator. Thus the expression is irreducible and is non-integer.

See also
Euclid's theorem that there are infinitely many primes
Small set (combinatorics)
Brun's theorem, on the convergent sum of reciprocals of the twin primes
List of sums of reciprocals

References

Sources

External links
 

Mathematical series
Articles containing proofs
Theorems about prime numbers